The Scarabaeini are a tribe of old-world dung beetle genera, erected by Pierre André Latreille.

Genera 

BioLib lists:
 Allogymnopleurus Janssens, 1940
 Garreta Janssens, 1940
 Gymnopleurus Illiger, 1803
 Mnematium MacLeay, 1821
 Neosisyphus G. Müller, 1942
 Nesosisyphus Vinson, 1946
 Pachylomera Kirby, 1828
 Paragymnopleurus Shipp, 1897
 Scarabaeus Linnaeus, 1758
 Sceliages Westwood, 1837
 Sisyphus Latreille, 1807
Note: a number of taxa including Kheper and Mnematidium are now considered subgenera of Scarabaeus.

References

External links
 
 

Beetle tribes